Cryptogemma unilineata is a species of sea snail, a marine gastropod mollusk in the family Turridae, the turrids.

Distribution
This marine species occurs off Hawaii and Réunion; also in the South China Sea.

References

 Powell, A.W.B. (1967) The family Turridae in the Indo-Pacific. Part 1a. The subfamily Turrinae concluded. Indo-Pacific Mollusca, 1, 409–444.

External links
 
 Zaharias P., Kantor Y.I., Fedosov A.E., Criscione F., Hallan A., Kano Y., Bardin J. & Puillandre N. (2020). Just the once will not hurt: DNA suggests species lumping over two oceans in deep-sea snails (Cryptogemma). Zoological Journal of the Linnean Society. DOI: 10.1093/zoolinnean/zlaa010/5802562
 Gastropods.com: Gemmula (Gemmula) congener unilineata

unilineata
Gastropods described in 1967